WIIW-LD (channel 14) is a low-power television station in Nashville, Tennessee, United States. It is owned and operated by Bridge Media Networks. WIIW-LD transmitter is located in Whites Creek.

History
The station was built and signed on by Equity Broadcasting in 1989, under the callsign of W11BZ. The station changed its callsign to WIIW-LP on February 5, 1996. It would not be until 1999, when the station would officially sign on, and would broadcast programming from Univision 24 hours a day. On December 18, 2003, Equity Broadcasting sold WIIW-LP to U.S. Television. Soon after the sale, programming from Univision was replaced with programming from Daystar. Univision's programming moved to Equity's newly acquired station, WNTU-LP, in 2006. Daystar's programming was discontinued in 2012 and replaced with programming from MTV2. On December 1, 2015, WIIW-LP was taken silent and remained off the air for five years, while the station was upgrading to digital. While the station was off the air, owners of the station (U.S. Television, LLC) stated that the station would return to the air as an independent station when the conversion to digital operations were completed. The station officially returned to the air on digital channel 29 on July 1, 2020 as an independent station. The station was receivable only in the Downtown Nashville area, while viewers outside the area could receive it. Therefore, the station was only broadcasting at a reduced limited amount of power, while the station developed a plan to build out the 15 kW construction permit for the station.

The station's analog license was cancelled by the Federal Communications Commission on May 11, 2021.

WIIW-LD renewed its license for digital operations on September 21, 2021. The station also filed with the FCC to relocate its channel from channel 29 to channel 14 on April 13, 2021.

On November 23, 2022, U.S. Television LLC, the company that owned WIIW since 2003, announced that they would sell the Station to Bridge Media Networks, the owner and operator of 24/7 headline news service NewsNet. Bridge also purchased WIIW-LD's sister station in Jacksonville, Florida (WWRJ-LD [channel 27]) and plans to convert both of those stations to NewsNet stations when the sale is finalized. Both transactions were closed on January 19, 2023.

Programming
As an independent station, WIIW-LP carried religious programming from Nashville Innercity Church of Christ. Also, the station featured other local programming mixed in as well.

Technical information

Subchannels

Analog-to-digital conversion
The deadline for the digital television transition for low-powered stations was supposed to be in September 2015, however, the cutoff date for standard LPTVs and translators still broadcasting in analog was suspended until further notice. Therefore, WIIW-LP maintained its analog signal on Channel 14. The analog signal on Channel 14 was silent until WIIW-LP converted to digital operations. It was decided, because of the FCC Spectrum Auction & Digital Repacking, all low-powered stations still broadcasting in analog must convert to digital operations by July 13, 2021. WIIW-LP maintained a construction permit to broadcast on digital UHF channel 25, however since digital channel 25 was already occupied with full-powered CBS affiliate WTVF (which moved its digital operations to channel 36), and currently occupied by MeTV affiliate WJFB as part of the FCC's spectrum auction and repacking, that construction permit was canceled. It was then determined that WIIW-LP would convert to digital operations on Channel 29, as it did maintain a construction permit to convert to digital operations on that channel. On July 1, 2020, WIIW-LP returned to the air broadcasting on UHF digital channel 29 and resumed operations at a reduced limited amount of power, while the station developed a plan to build out the 15 kW construction permit for the station. The station was receivable only in the Downtown Nashville area, while viewers outside the area could not receive it. As a result of WIIW turning on its digital signal, the analog signal on channel 14 was discontinued at the same time on July 1, 2020. The station displayed digitally and virtually on Channel 29.

References

External links
 

IIW-LP
Television channels and stations established in 1990
1990 establishments in Tennessee
Defunct television stations in the United States
Television channels and stations disestablished in 2021
2021 disestablishments in Tennessee
Defunct mass media in Tennessee